The following is an alphabetically ordered list of notable Latino members of the United States Democratic Party, past and present.

A
 Pete Aguilar, Congressman from California
 Jessica Alba, actress
 Aída Álvarez, 20th Administrator of the Small Business Administration
 Toney Anaya, 26th Governor of New Mexico
 Jerry Apodaca, 24th Governor of New Mexico

B

 Polly Baca, Chair of the Democratic Caucus of the Colorado House of Representatives (1976–79) and member of the Colorado State Senate and the House and Senate of a state Legislature. 
 Herman Badillo, former Congressman from New York
 Hector Balderas, New Mexico State Auditor
 Xavier Becerra, Congressman from California and Chairman of the House Democratic Caucus
 Albert Bustamante, former Congressman from Texas

C

 Yvanna Cancela, Chief of Staff to Nevada Governor
 Tony Cárdenas, Congressman from California
 Julian Castro, United States Secretary of Housing and Urban Development
 Joaquin Castro, Congressman from Texas
 Raúl Héctor Castro, 14th Governor of Arizona
 Lauro Cavazos, former United States Secretary of Education
 Dennis Chávez, former Senator and former Congressman from New Mexico
 Henry Cisneros, former United States Secretary of Housing and Urban Development
 Maria Contreras-Sweet, Administrator of the Small Business Administration
 Baltasar Corrada del Río, former Resident Commissioner of Puerto Rico and former Associate Justice of the Supreme Court of Puerto Rico
 Jim Costa, Congressman from California
 Henry Cuellar, Congressman from Texas

D
 Ezequiel Cabeza De Baca, 2nd Governor of New Mexico
 Kika de la Garza, former Congressman from Texas
 Ron de Lugo, former delegate from the U.S. Virgin Islands
 Mo Denis, Nevada state senator and former Majority Leader of the Nevada Senate
 Manny Diaz, former Mayor of Miami

E
 Albert Estopinal, former Congressman from Louisiana
 Albert Estopinal Jr., former Sheriff of St. Bernard Parish

F
 Maurice Ferre, former Mayor of Miami
 Antonio M. Fernández, former Congressman from Louisiana
 Joachim O. Fernández, former Congressman from Louisiana
 Jaime Fuster, Resident Commissioner of Puerto Rico and former Associate Justice of the Supreme Court of Puerto Rico

G

 Pete Gallego, Congressman from Texas
 Ruben Gallego, Congressman from Arizona
 Jose Manuel Gallegos, Delegate from New Mexico
 Joe Garcia, former Congressman from Florida
 Joseph Garcia, Lieutenant Governor of Colorado
 Robert García, Congressman from New York
 Alejandro García Padilla, Governor of Puerto Rico
 Eric Garcetti, Mayor of Los Angeles
 Charlie Gonzalez, former Congressman from Texas
 Henry B. Gonzalez, former Congressman from Texas
 Nellie Gorbea, Rhode Island Secretary of State
 Raúl Grijalva, Congressman from Arizona

H
 Ruben Hinojosa, Congressman from Texas

I
 Luis V. Gutierrez, Congressman from Illinois

L
 Ladislas Lazaro, former Congressman from Louisiana
 Eva Longoria, actress
 Ben Ray Luján, Congressman from New Mexico
 Michelle Luján Grisham, Governor of New Mexico

M

 Louis H. Marrero, governor of Saint Bernard Parish, Louisiana (1884–1896), Sheriff (1896), President of Jefferson Parish, Louisiana (1884–1916) and United States Senator for Louisiana 
 Robert Menendez, Senator from New Jersey
 Joseph Montoya, former Senator from New Mexico
 Cecilia Muñoz,  director of the White House Domestic Policy Council
 Janet Murguia, President of the National Council of La Raza

N
 Grace Napolitano, Congresswoman from California
 Gloria Negrete McLeod, Congresswoman from California
 Samuel B. Nunez Jr., Louisiana State Senator and President of the Louisiana State Senate

O
 Solomon P. Ortiz, former Congressman from Texas

P

 Ed Pastor, Congressman from Arizona
 Federico Peña, former United States Secretary of Transportation and former United States Secretary of Energy
 John Pérez, former Speaker of the California State Assembly
 Leander Perez, Democratic political boss of Plaquemines and St. Bernard parishes, Louisiana 
 Thomas Perez, United States Secretary of Labor
 Pedro Pierluisi, Resident Commissioner of Puerto Rico

R
 Silvestre Reyes, former Congressman from Texas
 Bill Richardson, former Congressman and the 30th Governor of New Mexico
 Edward R. Roybal, former Congressman from California
 Lucille Roybal-Allard, Congresswoman from California
 Raul Ruiz, Congressman from California

S

 Gregorio Sablan, Delegate from Northern Mariana Islands
 Ken Salazar, former Senator and former United States Secretary of the Interior
 Linda Sanchez, Congresswoman from California
 Loretta Sanchez, Congresswoman from California
 Pedro Segarra, Mayor of Hartford, Connecticut
 Jose Serrano, Congressman from New York
 Albio Sires, Congressman from New Jersey
 Hilda Solis, former Congresswoman from California and the 25th United States Secretary of Labor
 Sonia Sotomayor, Associate Justice of the United States Supreme Court

T
 Angel Taveras, Mayor of Providence, Rhode Island
 Esteban Edward Torres, former Congressman from California
 Norma Torres, Congresswoman from California
 Patricia Torres Ray, first Hispanic woman to serve in the MN Senate as MN Democratic–Farmer–Labor Party SD63

V
 Juan Vargas, Congressman from California
 Leticia Vasquez, former mayor of Lynwood, California
 Filemon Vela, Jr., Congressman from Texas
 Nydia Velázquez, Congresswoman from New York
 Antonio Villaraigosa, 41st Mayor of Los Angeles

See also

Congressional Hispanic Caucus
List of Latin Americans
List of Latino Republicans
List of Latino Americans in the United States Congress

References

 
 
 
 
Lists of American politicians